Wise Up was a British factual children's television programme broadcast for nine series on Sunday mornings between 1995 and 2000 on Channel 4 (UK) and T4. It was produced by Carlton Productions, and was directed by Martin Wallace. As well as reports, there were also regular features such as a feature called Knowing Me, Knowing You. It was similar to a BBC programme called Ipso Facto.

In December 1999 there was an hour-long special called Wise Up: Teenagers on the Line in which a 15-year-old girl travelled from London to Paris and Bamako, Mali to explore teenage life in different countries each on the Greenwich Meridian Line.

Production
The programme led to the formation of Wised Up Productions involving Mick Robertson and Simon Morris. Morris did not contribute to Wise Up, though he did contribute to the catalogue of programmes produced by Wised Up Productions.

Reception
The programme was nominated for a BAFTA in 1996, a Children's BAFTA in 2000.

As part of the 25th Anniversary of Channel 4, Wise Up was featured in Radio Times.

Awards and nominations

See also
The Lowdown
Why Don't You?

References

External links

1995 British television series debuts
2000 British television series endings
Channel 4 original programming
Peabody Award-winning television programs